Elizabeth Cervantes Barron (March 14, 1938 – February 10, 2020) was a frequent candidate for political offices on the Peace and Freedom Party ticket.

Personal life
Cervantes Barron was born in Los Angeles, California, and was the mother of 3 children

Political career
Cervantes Barron ran for U.S. Representative from California in 1974. In 1978 she became the party's "all time top vote getter" when she ran for California State Controller, getting 300,000 votes.

In 1980 she ran for United States Vice President as the running mate of Maureen Smith, winning more than 18,000 votes. She ran for United States Senator from California in 1994, winning 255,301 votes, but lost to Dianne Feinstein. She was the Peace and Freedom Party candidate for California State Controller in 2006, receiving 212,383 votes, 2.5% of the total.

References 

Women in California politics
Female candidates for Vice President of the United States
Peace and Freedom Party vice presidential nominees
1980 United States vice-presidential candidates
Candidates in the 1974 United States elections
Candidates in the 1994 United States elections
Candidates in the 2006 United States elections
20th-century American politicians
21st-century American politicians
21st-century American women politicians
20th-century American women politicians
1938 births

2020 deaths